Greenodd is a village in the Furness area of the county of Cumbria, England, but within the historical county of Lancashire. For local government purposes the village is also within the area of South Lakeland District. It is located 3 miles (5 km) north-east of Ulverston at the junction of the A590 trunk road and the A5092 trunk road. SD 315825). Greenodd is within the Crake Valley area of South Lakeland District. The 2001 UK census gives a population of 1823 for the Crake Valley. Greenodd and adjacent Penny Bridge are the main districts in the Crake Valley. The River Crake flows into the estuary of the River Leven at Greenodd.

History

The name Greenodd is of Scandinavian origin, the odd meaning ness (headland) in this case (the name translates literally as 'The Green Promontory'). Swedish toponymist Eilert Ekwall speculated that the name was not an old one, as 'odd' remained part of the Lancashire dialect until at least the early 20th century. In the late-18th and early-19th centuries Greenodd was a significant port; a creek-port of Lancaster. Exports included copper ore from Coniston, locally quarried limestone, and gunpowder from the nearby settlement of Backbarrow. Sugar, raw cotton and coal are listed in historical documents as some of the imports. Greenodd was also a shipbuilding centre with vessels up to 200 tons being constructed. On the darker side it is likely that Greenodd was involved in the North American slave trade. Today there are no signs of the former commercial activities. The Ship Inn, previously a warehouse on the quayside, is one of the few reminders of Greenodd's illustrious past.

Greenodd today

Until the 1980s Greenodd was on the A590 trunk road from Barrow to Levens Bridge. Traffic volumes were a major problem for the small village. These problems were alleviated by the building of a bypass to take the traffic over a new bridge across the River Crake. The village is now effectively a cul-de-sac. Greenodd railway station was served by the Lakeside branch of the Furness Railway from 1869 until its closure in 1965. Today there is no trace of the railway, the station having been demolished to make way for a dual-carriageway road. Greenodd is now also on the W2W Cycle Route between Walney and Wearmouth.

In 2008, Greenodd was involved in a battle to save its post office. The government announced in late 2006 that it would shutting 2,500 post offices nationwide, citing the rising losses and fewer number of people using them as the primary reasons. The inhabitants of Greenodd protested at the move, and even gained the support of the MP from the neighbouring constituency of Westmorland and Lonsdale, Tim Farron. Farron put his name to a petition which gained 6,800 signatures, but it was to no avail.

Notable people
 Christine McVie of Fleetwood Mac was born in the nearby village of Bouth.

See also

Listed buildings in Colton, Cumbria
Listed buildings in Egton with Newland

References

External links

Cumbria County History Trust: Egton with Newland (nb: provisional research only – see Talk page)
The online petition to try to save Greenodd Post Office

Villages in Cumbria
South Lakeland District
Furness